The 2023 Nigerian presidential election in Cross River State will be held on 25 February 2023 as part of the nationwide 2023 Nigerian presidential election to elect the president and vice president of Nigeria. Other federal elections, including elections to the House of Representatives and the Senate, will also be held on the same date while state elections will be held two weeks afterward on 11 March.

Background
Cross River State is a diverse state in the South South with growing economy and vast natural areas but facing an underdeveloped yet vital agricultural sector, deforestation, and rising debt in large part due to years of systemic corruption. Politically, the state's 2019 elections were categorized as a continuation of the PDP's control as Ayade won with over 73% of the vote and the party won every seat in the House of Assembly along with all three senate seats. However, the PDP did lose one House of Representatives seat to the APC and although the state was easily won by PDP presidential nominee Atiku Abubakar, it still swung towards Buhari compared to 2015 and had lower turnout.

Polling

Projections

General election

Results

By senatorial district 
The results of the election by senatorial district.

By federal constituency
The results of the election by federal constituency.

By local government area 
The results of the election by local government area.

See also 
 2023 Cross River State elections
 2023 Nigerian presidential election

Notes

References 

Cross River State gubernatorial election
2023 Cross River State elections
Cross River